Jonathan Scott Adkins  (born August 30, 1977) is an American former Major League Baseball (MLB) pitcher who played for the Chicago White Sox, San Diego Padres, New York Mets, and Cincinnati Reds from 2003 to 2008, and an MLB scout for the Los Angeles Dodgers.

Playing career

Amateur
Adkins graduated from Oklahoma State University. In 1996, he played collegiate summer baseball with the Orleans Cardinals of the Cape Cod Baseball League. He was drafted by the Oakland Athletics in the ninth round of the 1998 Major League Baseball draft.

Professional
In April , he pitched in three games for the San Diego Padres, and was then optioned to the Padres' Triple-A affiliate, the Portland Beavers. On November 15, 2006, Adkins was traded to the New York Mets along with Ben Johnson for Heath Bell and Royce Ring. On July 28, he was called up from the minor leagues. On December 6, 2007, the Cincinnati Reds signed Adkins to a minor league contract.

With the Triple-A Louisville, Adkins served as their closer and saved 30 games (IL leader) with a 3.48 ERA. On September 9, Adkins was recalled, and pitched 1/3 of an inning and got the win. He was released in January to pitch for the Lotte Giants in the Korea Baseball Organization. He led the KBO in saves with 26 in 2009. On December 2, 2009, he signed a minor league deal with the Cincinnati Reds. On July 11, 2010, Cincinnati released Adkins. On July 29, 2010, Adkins signed with the Chicago White Sox and was assigned to Triple-A Charlotte.

Scouting career
Adkins was released by the White Sox in September 2010 and named to the amateur scouting staff of the Boston Red Sox covering the Ohio River Valley  in January 2011.

References

External links

1977 births
Living people
Arizona League Athletics players
Baseball players from West Virginia
Boston Red Sox scouts
Charlotte Knights players
Chicago White Sox players
Cincinnati Reds players
American expatriate baseball players in South Korea
Lotte Giants players
Louisville Bats players
Los Angeles Dodgers scouts
Major League Baseball pitchers
Modesto A's players
Navegantes del Magallanes players
New Orleans Zephyrs players
New York Mets players
Oklahoma State Cowboys baseball players
Orleans Firebirds players
Sportspeople from Huntington, West Virginia
Portland Beavers players
Sacramento River Cats players
San Diego Padres players
American expatriate baseball players in Venezuela